Audrey Moore may refer to:

 Audrey Moore (politician) (born 1928), politician from Fairfax County, Virginia
 Audrey Moore (swimmer) (born 1964), Australian swimmer
 Audrey Moore (actress), American actress